The women's 200 metres at the 2016 European Athletics Championships took place at the Olympic Stadium in Amsterdam on 6 and 7 July.

Records

Schedule

Results

Round 1

First 3 in each heat (Q) and the next fastest 4 (q) advance to the Semifinals.

Wind:Heat 1: +0.9 m/s, Heat 2: +1.1 m/s, Heat 3: +0.2 m/s, Heat 4: +0.7 m/s

Semifinals

First 2 in each heat (Q) and the next fastest 2 (q) advance to the Semifinals.

Wind:Heat 1: 0.0 m/s, Heat 2: 0.0 m/s, Heat 3: +1.3 m/s

*Athletes who received a bye to the semifinals

Final 
Wind: -0.4 m/s

References

External links
 amsterdam2016.org, official championship site.

200 W
200 metres at the European Athletics Championships
2016 in women's athletics